Toby Tubby Creek is a stream in the U.S. state of Mississippi.

The creek is named after Toby Tubby, a Chickasaw chieftain. A variant name is "Tobi Tubby Creek".

References

Rivers of Mississippi
Rivers of Lafayette County, Mississippi
Mississippi placenames of Native American origin